Antoni Dunin (1907–1939) was a Polish nobleman (szlachta), a Hrabia (Count), and an army officer who received the Virtuti Militari award.


Biography 

Dunin was born on June 5, 1907, the youngest child of Lucia (Łucja) Taczanowska (1862–1917) and her second husband Count Rodryg Dunin (1870–1928).  He grew up at the Granówko estate near Poznań, the youngest of ten children. He had six older siblings by his mother's first marriage to Stanisław Niezychowski, and two full sisters and one full brother, children of  his own father Rodryg. The Dunin family crest is the Łabędź (swan).

On December 28, 1933, Dunin married Zofia Helena Werner (1910–1939), daughter of Poland's vice-Finance Minister Edward Werner, and great-niece of Saint Raphael Kalinowski.  They had three children: Krystyna, Stanley (Stanisław, named after Dunin's older brother), and Magda (Magdelena). 

Between 1933 and 1934 he served as an NCO in the Polish Army and graduated from the Cavalry Training Centre, where he was also awarded with the memorial badge of his home unit, the 15th Poznań Uhlan's Regiment. Mobilized prior to the outbreak of World War II, Dunin was drafted into the Wielkopolska Cavalry Brigade under Gen. Roman Abraham. Serving in the rank of Porucznik (First Lieutenant) he commanded the march squadron of the 15th Poznań Uhlan's Regiment. He joined the regiment with his unit on September 8, 1939, and took part in the Battle of Bzura. Dunin was killed in combat at the age of 32 on September 16, 1939. His wife was killed the next day, at the age of 29.

Dunin's descendants were eventually able to escape Poland to France and finally to the United States in the 1940s.

In popular culture 

Dunin is one of the characters in the Italian novel "Il Guardiano dei Sogni" (The Guardian of Dreams) by Paolo Maurensig.

See also 
 Dunin (surname), other figures who share the family name

References 

1907 births
1939 deaths
Counts of Poland
Polish Army officers
Recipients of the Virtuti Militari
Antoni
Polish military personnel killed in World War II